Improvement District No. 12 (Jasper National Park), or Improvement District No. 12, is an improvement district in Alberta, Canada. Coextensive with Jasper National Park in Alberta's Rockies, the improvement district is the municipality that provides local government for the portion of the park outside the Municipality of Jasper.

History 
Improvement District (I.D.) No. 12 was originally formed as I.D. No. 80 on April 1, 1945 through the amalgamation of I.D. Nos. 379, 438, 439, 469, 499, 500, and 530, as well as portions of I.D. Nos. 348, 378, 436, 437, 466, 468, 498, 528, 529, and 558. I.D. No. 80 was renumbered to I.D. No. 12 on January 1, 1969.

A second improvement district, Jasper Improvement District, was separated from I.D. No. 12 on August 31, 1995. Jasper Improvement District subsequently became a specialized municipality named the Municipality of Jasper on July 20, 2001.

Geography

Communities and localities 
There are no communities located within Improvement District No. 12.

The following localities are located within Improvement District No. 12.
Localities 

Athabasca Falls
Devona
East Gate Trailers
Lake Edith
Miette

Miette Hot Springs
Pocahontas
Shale Banks
Snaring
Sunwapta

Demographics 

Government 
Improvement District No. 12 is administered by Alberta Municipal Affairs.

See also 
List of communities in Alberta

References 

1945 establishments in Alberta
Jasper National Park

12